Ray Palmer may refer to:

 Raymond A. Palmer, science-fiction writer and editor
 Raymond F. Palmer, medical professor 
 Ray Palmer (pastor), American pastor and author of hymns
 Ray Palmer (Arrowverse), a TV show character based on his comic book counterpart
 Atom (Ray Palmer), a DC Comics comic book character